Subadyte campechensis is a scale worm known from a single specimen collected in the Gulf of Mexico at a depth of 640 m.

Description
the single specimen of Subadyte campechensis is fragmentary so the number of segments is unknown but is presumably short-bodied and with 15 pairs of elytra. The species is rather transparent, except for some brownish pigment on ceratophores of antennae, yellow and brownish pigmentation on dorsum and dark pharynx. The lateral antennae are positioned ventrally on prostomium, directly beneath median antenna ceratophore. The notochaetae are distinctly thicker than the neurochaetae, which also possess bidentate tips.

References

Phyllodocida